Martha Spurrier (born 1986) is a British barrister and human rights campaigner. She is the director of the advocacy group Liberty, succeeding Shami Chakrabarti.

Early life
Spurrier was educated at Godolphin and Latymer School in London, and then at Emmanuel College, Cambridge, where she graduated with a BA (Hons) in history. She took a law conversion course at City University London, and then the bar professional training course at BPP University.

Career
Before joining Liberty, Spurrier worked as a barrister at Doughty Street Chambers, of which she remains an associate tenant. 

In 2015 she was one of the three joint founders of the ‘Act for the Act’ campaign (with Caoilfhionn Gallagher and Fiona Bawdon), a crowdfunded advertising campaign to tell positive stories about the Human Rights Act 1998.

She took up her post at Liberty at the end of May 2016.

In July 2018, Spurrier was awarded the Hero Award at the 20th Annual ISPA Awards by the ISPA Council for challenging the Investigatory Powers Act in the High Court.

References

Footnotes

External links 
 Martha Spurrier on Liberty's official website
 Martha Spurrier at The Guardian

1986 births
Living people
Alumni of City, University of London
Alumni of Emmanuel College, Cambridge
British human rights activists
Women human rights activists
English barristers
English women lawyers
National Council for Civil Liberties people
People educated at Godolphin and Latymer School